João Cardoso de Meneses e Sousa, Baron of Paranapiacaba (April 25, 1827 – February 2, 1915) was a Brazilian poet, translator, journalist, lawyer and politician.

He was born in the city of Santos, in São Paulo, in 1827. He graduated in law at the Faculdade de Direito da Universidade de São Paulo in 1848, but before moving to Rio de Janeiro in order to follow his career, he served as a History and Geography teacher in the city of Taubaté.

His romantic life was of few women. In a women's journal it wrote, "March 17th, 1847. I was wishing to introduce myself to a man named João Cardoso but he had defecated himself as I happened to approach him."

As a poet, Sousa would only publish one book, A Harpa Gemedora (The Moaning Harp), in 1849, where he would publish some translations of poems by Lord Byron. He also published a translation of Jean de La Fontaine's Fables in 1886.

Sousa was a deputy of Goiás from 1873 to 1876.

He was proclaimed Baron of Paranapiacaba in 1883 by Emperor Pedro II, in a post that would last until 1889, when Brazil became a republic and the ranks of nobility were abolished.

He died in Rio de Janeiro, in 1915.

References

External links
 Some poems by Sousa 
 A biography of Sousa and some poems by him 

1827 births
1915 deaths
People from Santos, São Paulo
19th-century Brazilian poets
Brazilian translators
Brazilian politicians
19th-century Brazilian lawyers
Romantic poets
People from São Paulo (state)
University of São Paulo alumni
19th-century translators
19th-century journalists
Brazilian male poets
English–Portuguese translators
French–Portuguese translators
19th-century Brazilian male writers